Moore's Indian Appeals is a 14-volume set of nominate reports by English barrister Edmund F. Moore, published in London from 1837 to 1872 under the full title of Reports of Cases Heard and Determined by the Judicial Committee and the Lords of His Majesty's most Honourable Privy Council on Appeal from the Supreme and Sudder Dewanny Courts in the East Indies, but more usually referred to as Moore's Indian Appeals and cited for example as: Moofti Mohummud Ubdoollah v. Baboo Mootechund 1 M.I.A. 383.

The Moore's Indian Appeals carries reports published from the year 1836 to 1872 in 14 Volumes. The set is supplemented by Law Reports Indian Appeals which carries judgements from the year 1873 to 1950 and published in 79 Volumes.

Sets of reports reprinted in the English Reports
Government of British India
1837 establishments in England
Judicial Committee of the Privy Council cases